New Cut may refer to:

 Haddiscoe Cut, on the Norfolk Broads, England
 The New Cut (Bristol) of the River Avon, Bristol, England
 The Cut, London, a street previously called the New Cut